Italy competed at the 1971 European Athletics Championships in Helsinki, Finland, from 10 to 15 August 1971.

Medalists

Results
(36 men, 11 women)

Men

Women

See also
 Italy national athletics team

References

External links
 EAA official site

Italy at the European Athletics Championships
Nations at the 1971 European Athletics Championships
1971 in Italian sport